Hirthia is a genus of tropical freshwater snails with an operculum, aquatic gastropod mollusks in the family Paludomidae.

Species
Species within the genus Hirthia include:
 Hirthia globosa Ancey, 1898
 Hirthia littorina Ancey, 1898

References

Paludomidae
Taxonomy articles created by Polbot